Guntur Medical College is a medical college in Guntur, India. It  offers graduate (master's) and undergraduate (bachelor's) courses in Medical Sciences.

The college is affiliated to the NTR University of Health Sciences (NTRUHS) and is in the process of becoming autonomous as Guntur Institute of Medical Sciences.

The college works in conjunction with Government General Hospital-Guntur, a tertiary care hospital with 1500 beds, catering to the health needs of the public of the coastal belt of Andhra Pradesh, India.

It has the Motto of - సత్యం - జ్ఞానం - అనంతం which means of Truth - Knowledge - Infinity

Departments 

 Departments in the college campus:  Anatomy, Biochemistry, Physiology, Pharmacology, Microbiology, Forensic Medicine, Pathology, Social & Preventive Medicine
 Departments in the hospital campus Casualty (Emergency Medicine), Internal Medicine, Paediatrics, Cardiology, Neurology, Venereology, Dermatology, Nephrology, Gastroenterology, Radiodiagnosis, Radiotherapy, Psychiatry, Neurology, Anaesthesiology, Fever Hospital, Surgery, Orthopaedics, ENT, Plastic Surgery, Paediatric Surgery, Urology, Neurosurgery, Ophthalmology, Dentistry, Obstetrics & Gynaecology
 The main campus works with the Guntur General Hospital on various issues. It is one of the few centers in the country to have satellite-based training.

History

The construction of the college was started in 1946. In July 1954, clinical courses started.  The college began with 50 undergraduate students. By 1960, the number was 150 studend the clinical subjects in 1958.

The college admits 78 postgraduate students every year. In addition to the undergraduate and postgraduate teaching, the college trains paramedical staff like radiographers, lab technicians, lab attendants, pharmacists, nurses, and sanitary inspectors.

After the formation of the AP University of Health Sciences in 1989, it was affiliated to APUHS  (now it is NTRUHS), Vijayawada.

Quiz programmes were conducted at college and national Levels to explore the skills of the students. There are sports activities and GMC students have won the University blues and athletic awards. GMC also has arts and cultural activities.

There is a students' co-operative store and a students' canteen on the campus.

The library accommodates 150 undergraduate students and 50 postgraduate students and has accommodation for staff. A reading room has been constructed by GMCANA for the benefit of students. The male students have hostel facilities located on the Amaravathi Road about 3  km. from the college. There are two buildings which provide accommodation for 302 students. A ladies' hostel opposite to Guntur Officers Club provides accommodation for 210 female students. There are college buses for the transport of students from the hostel to the college and hospital. Both hostels are located in an area which serves as a playground for sports activities.

Guntur General Hospital has a bed count of 1038. The OP departments provide medical relief for between four and five thousand people daily. The hospital houses an interns' hostel, a postgraduates' hostel, and a  nursing school.

Notable alumni
 Dr. Soma Raju Bhupatiraju, cardiologist, surgeon, Chairman of CARE Hospitals
 Gopi Chand Mannam, cardiothoracic surgeon, Managing Director of Star Hospitals, Padma Shri recipient
 A. G. K. Gokhale, Cardiac Surgeon at Apollo Hospitals, Padma Shri recipient
 Jayaprakash Narayana, IAS, founder and President of  Loksatta, Ex.MLA (Kukatpally), Andhra Pradesh
 Late Kodela Siva Prasad, General Surgeon and prominent politician of TDP from Narasarao Peta, Ex.MLA, Ex.Minister and First Speaker of Legislative Assembly of residual Andhra Pradesh from 2014-2019.
 Yarlagadda Nayudamma, pediatric surgeon

References

External links 

 
 GMCANA - Alumni of North America

Colleges in Guntur
1946 establishments in India
Medical colleges in Andhra Pradesh
Educational institutions established in 1946